Kévin Vandendriessche (born 7 August 1989) is a French footballer of Belgian descent who plays as a midfielder for Belgian club Kortrijk.

Club career
On 8 January 2021, he signed a two-year contract with Kortrijk which began in July 2021.

References

1989 births
French people of Belgian descent
French people of Flemish descent
People from Lesquin
Living people
French footballers
Association football midfielders
En Avant Guingamp players
Wasquehal Football players
Royal Excel Mouscron players
K.V. Oostende players
K.V. Kortrijk players
Belgian Pro League players
Challenger Pro League players
French expatriate footballers
Expatriate footballers in Belgium
French expatriate sportspeople in Belgium
Footballers from Hauts-de-France